ElderTreks is a Canadian adventure travel company for people over the age of 50.

History
ElderTreks was founded in 1987 by Tov Mason and Gary Murtagh. Having travelled to more than 100 countries, Murtagh now operates tours to over 100 countries, and helps travelers who are 50 years and over. The organization supports charities and conservation groups around the world. Some of the popular tours include Iran, Cuba and Myanmar. Groups are no larger than 16 guests and focus on exploring nature, wildlife and culture.

Location
ElderTreks is now located at 23 Clinton Street, Toronto, ON M6J 2N9

References

External links
 Frommers: Arthur Frommer Online 
 New York Times article 
 Toronto Globe and Mail article 
 Comcast.net Finance article

Travel and holiday companies of Canada